Noci is a railway station in Noci, Italy. The station is located on the Bari–Martina Franca–Taranto railway. The train services and the railway infrastructure are operated by Ferrovie del Sud Est.

Train services
The station is served by the following service(s):

Local services (Treno regionale) Bari - Conversano - Putignano - Martina Franca

References

This article is based upon a translation of the Italian language version as at May 2014.

Railway stations in Apulia
Buildings and structures in the Province of Bari